Spider Mountain is an  mountain summit located in the Glacier Peak Wilderness in western Chelan County of Washington state. It is part of the North Cascades, which is a subset of the Cascade Range. Meltwater from the Spider Glacier on the steep north face, and other surface runoff from the mountain drains into Flat Creek, which is a tributary of the Stehekin River. The nearest higher neighbor is Mount Formidable  to the west. The Middle Cascade Glacier lies between these two mountains, and the Ptarmigan Traverse passes through also.

Climate

Spider Mountain is located in the marine west coast climate zone of western North America. Most weather fronts originate in the Pacific Ocean, and travel northeast toward the Cascade Mountains. As fronts approach the North Cascades, they are forced upward by the peaks of the Cascade Range, causing them to drop their moisture in the form of rain or snowfall onto the Cascades (Orographic lift). As a result, the west side of the North Cascades experiences high precipitation, especially during the winter months in the form of snowfall. During winter months, weather is usually cloudy, but, due to high pressure systems over the Pacific Ocean that intensify during summer months, there is often little or no cloud cover during the summer. In terms of favorable weather, July through September are best for climbing.

Geology

The North Cascades features some of the most rugged topography in the Cascade Range with craggy peaks and ridges, deep glacial valleys, and granite spires. Geological events occurring many years ago created the diverse topography and drastic elevation changes over the Cascade Range leading to various climate differences.

The history of the formation of the Cascade Mountains dates back millions of years ago to the late Eocene Epoch. With the North American Plate overriding the Pacific Plate, episodes of volcanic igneous activity persisted. In addition, small fragments of the oceanic and continental lithosphere called terranes created the North Cascades about 50 million years ago.

During the Pleistocene period dating back over two million years ago, glaciation advancing and retreating repeatedly scoured the landscape leaving deposits of rock debris. The "U"-shaped cross section of the river valleys are a result of recent glaciation. Uplift and faulting in combination with glaciation have been the dominant processes which have created the tall peaks and deep valleys of the North Cascades area.

See also

 Geography of the North Cascades
 Geology of the Pacific Northwest
 List of highest mountain peaks in Washington

References

External links
 Spider Mountain weather: Mountain Forecast
 Spider Mountain photo: Flickr

North Cascades
Mountains of Washington (state)
Mountains of Chelan County, Washington
Cascade Range
North Cascades of Washington (state)
North American 2000 m summits